Kenneth Ehren McGhehey Jr. (born November 29, 1976), also known as Danger Ehren, is an American stunt performer, actor and former professional snowboarder. He is best known as one of the cast members of the reality stunt franchise Jackass.

Early life
McGhehey was born and raised in McMinnville, Oregon to father Kenneth and mother Linda. He grew up in a mortuary as both his parents were morticians. He is the youngest of three children (in birth order: Lesley, Stacey, and Ehren). He started skateboarding at the age of 12. After graduating from McMinnville High School in 1995, he became a professional snowboarder. He later retired from snowboarding due to breaking his neck and got a job at a skate shop in Portland, Oregon. There, he filmed some of his ideas and stunts on a small scale.

Jackass

McGhehey joined Jackass after his good friend Dave England asked director Jeff Tremaine to put him on the team. He later appeared in all three seasons and four Jackass films. His motto when performing stunts on the show was "Safety First". McGhehey is often referred to by his nickname "Danger Ehren" by fellow Jackass cast and crew, not least due to his tendency to injure himself and lose teeth in the pursuit of stunts. 

He's the butt of many jokes by the Jackass crew, most notably in the infamous "Terror Taxi" skit from Jackass Number Two, one of Johnny Knoxville's favorites. In a stunt where McGhehey played a terrorist passenger in a taxicab, he unknowingly wore a "pube beard" made up from the shaved pubic hair of his co-stars and crew members. In a podcast with Steve-O, McGhehey suggested some of those jokes amounted to bullying, and that some of it happened off-camera.

Filmography

Television

Film

Web series

Music videos

Video games

References

External links 
Official Jackass site (archived)

1976 births
American stunt performers
Jackass (TV series)
Living people
People from McMinnville, Oregon